C. H. Sykes may refer to:

Christopher Sykes (author), British writer
Charles Henry Sykes, American cartoonist
Charles H. Sykes, American politician

See also
Sykes (disambiguation)